The 1961 Dixie 400 was a NASCAR Grand National Series event that was held on September 17, 1961, at Atlanta International Raceway in Hampton, Georgia.

A filming of a full-length feature Hollywood film entitled Thundering Wheels was a part of the festivities planned for this race in addition to a 210-minute performance by some of the legendary performers from the Grand Ole Opry.<ref name="dixie400entriesatlanta">[https://news.google.com/newspapers?nid=1454&dat=19621021&id=4kRjAAAAIBAJ&sjid=Q3QNAAAAIBAJ&pg=3483,4150775 Dixie 400 Entries Pour into Atlanta] at Star-News (Google News Archive Search)</ref>
Local beauty pageant personality Linda Vaughn was chosen to be the queen of the 1961 running of the Dixie 400.

Background
Atlanta International Raceway (now Atlanta Motor Speedway) is one of ten current intermediate track to hold NASCAR races; the others are Charlotte Motor Speedway, Chicagoland Speedway, Darlington Raceway, Homestead Miami Speedway, Kansas Speedway, Kentucky Speedway, Las Vegas Motor Speedway, New Hampshire Motor Speedway, and Texas Motor Speedway. However, at the time, only Charlotte and Darlington were built.

The track's turns are banked at twenty-four degrees, while the front stretch, the location of the finish line, and the back stretch are banked at five.

Race report
While Fireball Roberts, Nelson Stacy and Banjo Matthews would dominate the earliest parts of this event, the closing moments were a contest between Junior Johnson and David Pearson. These drivers had the monopoly on the first-place position throughout the race; tying with the 1960 Atlanta 500 with the fewest lead changes.

The 267-lap race lasted three hours and eleven minutes. There were 42 American-born drivers on the grid out of the 46 who originally qualified for this event. Tommy Irwin would suffer from a bad piston in his vehicle that prevented him from starting the race; he was credited as the last-place finisher. Lee Reitzel would be the lowest-finishing driver to complete the entire event while Banjo Matthew's faulty engine prevented him from finishing in the top ten. Lap deficits were noticed between the top cars once Banjo dropped out; forcing the flagman to throw the white flag multiple times. Thirty thousand people would see David Pearson defeat Junior Johnson by five seconds. Fred Lorenzen's engine blew, spewing oil on the track. Lorenzen's car spun into a concrete retaining wall and Fireball Roberts narrowly missed him. Dave Mader spun into a guardrail, knocking him unconscious.

This would be the last start for Jesse James Taylor, the same one that finished 2nd in the 1951 Southern 500, and then was critically injured at Lakewood that year.

NASCAR originally made a bad judgment call and declared Bunkie Blackburn the winner. The reason behind this bad call was that one of David Pearson's laps were never officially counted; they decided to re-mark it as official. Most of the spectators had left by the time that Pearson was given the actual win.

The transition to purpose-built racecars began in the early 1960s and occurred gradually over that decade.  Changes made to the sport by the late 1960s brought an end to the "strictly stock" vehicles of the 1950s.

Individual earnings for each driver ranged from the winner's share of $9,330 ($ when adjusted for inflation) to the last-place finisher's share of $200 ($ when adjusted for inflation). The total prize purse for this event was $39,960 ($ when adjusted for inflation). Six notable crew chiefs would take part in this race, including Ray Fox, Bud Allman and Shorty Johns.

Qualifying

Failed to qualify: Tony Lavati (#66)

Retirements
Dave Mader and Jesse James Taylor would retire from NASCAR Cup Series competition after the conclusion of this event.

Finishing order
Section reference:

 David Pearson (No. 3)
 Junior Johnson (No. 27)
 Fireball Roberts (No. 22)
 Jack Smith (No. 47)
 Richard Petty (No. 43)
 Johnny Allen (No. 14)
 Ned Jarrett (No. 11)
 Bob Welborn (No. 46)
 Woodie Wilson (No. 51)
 Marvin Panch (No. 6)
 Banjo Matthews* (No. 94)
 Bobby Johns (No. 72)
 Jim Paschal (No. 44)
 Emanuel Zervakis (No. 85)
 Tiny Lund (No. 30)
 Joe Weatherly (No. 8)
 Ken Rush (No. 59)
 Rex White (No. 4)
 Nelson Stacy* (No. 29)
 Darel Dieringer* (No. 24)
 L.D. Austin (No. 74)
 Herman Beam (No. 19)
 Ed Livingston (No. 68)
 Lee Reitzel (No. 93)
 Buck Baker* (No. 87)
 Bill Morgan* (No. 32)
 J.C. Hendrix* (No. 78)
 Elmo Langley* (No. 96)
 Bunkie Blackburn* (No. 9)
 T.C. Hunt* (No. 10)
 G.C. Spencer* (No. 48)
 Bob Barron* (No. 71)
 Doug Yates* (No. 23)
 George Alsobrook* (No. 99)
 Ralph Earnhardt* (No. 5)
 Fred Lorenzen* (No. 28)
 Dave Mader* (No. 90)
 Tubby Gonzales* (No. 80)
 Herb Tillman* (No. 86)
 Jesse James Taylor* (No. 15)
 Curtis Crider* (No. 62)
 Tommy Irwin* (No. 2)* Driver failed to finish race''

Timeline
Section reference:
 Start of race: Fireball Roberts officially started the race with the pole position; Tommy Irwin had to leave the race due to a problem with one of his pistons.
 Lap 3: A bearing came loose off of Curtis Crider's vehicle.
 Lap 10: Engine problems managed to bring Jesse James Taylor's race to a screeching halt.
 Lap 28: Fred Lorenzen took over the lead from Fireball Roberts.
 Lap 36: Nelson Stacy took over the lead from Fred Lorenzen.
 Lap 46: Oil pressure issues ended Herb Tillman's day on the track.
 Lap 47: Engine problems managed to relegate Tubby Gonzales to the sidelines.
 Lap 51: Dave Mader had a terminal crash.
 Lap 52: Fred Lorenzen had a terminal crash.
 Lap 53: Joe Weatherly took over the lead from Nelson Stacy.
 Lap 57: Banjo Matthews took over the lead from Joe Weatherly.
 Lap 62: Ralph Earnhardt's vehicle developed problems with its transmission.
 Lap 63: A problematic piston managed to take George Alsobrook out of the race.
 Lap 65: Oil pressure issues effectively eliminate Doug Yates out of the event.
 Lap 200: Bobby Johns took over the lead from Banjo Matthews.
 Lap 203: A troublesome piston forced Bill Morgan to leave the race due to safety reasons.
 Lap 209: Buck Baker could not cope with a problematic engine, forcing him to finish in a miserable 25th place.
 Lap 211: Nelson Stacy took over the lead from Bobby Johns.
 Lap 238: Darel Dieringer had a terminal crash; forcing him to exit the event prematurely.
 Lap 243: Nelson Stacy managed to blow his engine while racing at high speeds.
 Lap 244: Banjo Matthews took over the lead from Nelson Stacy.
 Lap 262: Banjo Matthews managed to blow his engine while racing at high speeds.
 Lap 264: Fireball Roberts took over the lead from Banjo Matthews.
 Lap 266: David Pearson took over the lead from Fireball Roberts.
 Finish: David Pearson officially became the winner of the event.

References

Dixie 400
Dixie 400
NASCAR races at Atlanta Motor Speedway